Paris Saint-Germain Football Club is a French professional football club based in Paris, that currently plays in Ligue 1. Founded in 1970, following the merger of Paris FC and Stade Saint-Germain, the club have completed 52 seasons, of which 49 have been played in the highest division in French football, known as Ligue 1. In 2021–22, PSG celebrated their 48th consecutive campaign in Ligue 1, which makes them the competitions's longest-serving club.

The club played its first official match on August 23, 1970, when it drew 1–1 away to Poitiers on matchday one of Ligue 2. PSG would go on to win the second division title at the end of the campaign, earning promotion to the top flight. The Parisians made their Ligue 1 debut on August 11, 1971, in a 2–0 defeat away to Angers. Their momentum was soon checked, however, and the club split in June 1972, Paris FC remaining in the first division and PSG administratively demoted to the third tier.

Following back-to-back promotions, PSG returned to Ligue 1 in the 1974–75 campaign, and have never looked back. Since then, the club have won ten league titles, finishing first more frequently than in any other position. Having come second in nine league campaigns, PSG have therefore made up the top two spots on 19 occasions. They have also reached the top five 27 times, which represents more than half of the club's seasons in Ligue 1. PSG's lowest-ever finish is 16th, both in 1971–72 (their first in Ligue 1) and 2007–08, when they escaped relegation on the final day of the season, with a 2–1 win at Sochaux.

The capital club experienced its best season to date in 2019–20, winning all four domestic titles, reaching the 2020 UEFA Champions League Final, and averaging a record 47,517 spectators per home league match. The Red and Blues also established several records during 2015–16. They secured 96 points, their highest points tally in Ligue 1, while conceding just 19 goals; won 47 matches across all competitions; and Zlatan Ibrahimović became the player with the most goals scored in a single season, finding the back of the net 50 times. Other notable records, all competitions included, are the 28 goals conceded in 1993–94, the 61 matches played in 1994–95, and the 171 goals scored in 2017–18.

Seasons

Table correct as of 21 May 2022.

Notes

References

External links

Official websites
PSG.FR - Site officiel du Paris Saint-Germain
Paris Saint-Germain - Ligue 1
Paris Saint-Germain - UEFA.com

 
Paris Saint-Germain
Paris Saint-Germain
Paris Saint-Germain F.C. seasons